Emias.info is the biggest online medical care scheduling service to Moscow state medical care facilities linked to EMIAS (United Medical and Informational Analytical System of Moscow).

History 
Emias.Info was designed as an online appointment service to Moscow state clinics.  With the development of EMIAS state project, along with Moscow state portal, "Emias.info" joined one of the first priorities of EMIAS - to minimize lines to the medical care facilities.

Statistics

Up to 50,000 people make appointments to state medical care facilities daily.
More than 1,000,000 people became constant users of the portal in Moscow in 2013.
Over 6,000,000 appointments made through the portal within the year.

Emias.Info extension

Emias.Info extension can be divided on three main stages:
 Development of primary functions of personal account.
 Functionality development and new services implementation  
 Implementation of "other" EMIAS and paramedical services.

On the first stage of the development primary functions of personal account appear.
Medical profile activation is available through the entering the policy obligatory medical insurance number and date of birth. 
After entering the profile, user gets an access to the following services:
Book the appointment;
Book the appointment to the referral physician.

The second stage of the development means providing new services and developing functionality, such as:
	Medical inspection lists’ review;
	Medical history review	;
	Detalization of referrals;
	Review of work incapacity certificate;
	Prescriptions review and medicine’ search (from the prescription) .

On the third stage of development other EMIAS and paramedical services will be implemented.

During the first year of work, the project was reconsidered by the team of programmers. According to the development program of the project, new services got implemented into the web-site. Betta version of Emias.Info was released on October 9, 2014 and on  October 20, 2014 the fully working version appeared on the screens of the patients. New version was called Emias.Info 2.0 and had a set of new services, becoming private page of the patient.

Emias.Info current services
Current version of the portal provides several services:	

 Book an appointment
 My appointments
 Book the appointment to the referral physician
 My prescriptions

References

External links
emias.info
Facebook: www.facebook.com/EMIAS.info
Facebook: www.facebook.com/moscow.health
Twitter: twitter.com/emias_news
Mhealth: emias.info

Healthcare in Russia
Electronic health record software